The Hollies Convent FCJ School was a girls' direct-grant Roman Catholic grammar school in south Manchester, England.

History
In 1820, Marie-Madeleine d'Houët, also known as Marie Madeleine Victoire, founded the society of the Faithful Companions of Jesus in Amiens, France.

The school began at the Hollies in September 1900 in Fallowfield.

Grammar school
In the mid-1940s, it became a direct-grant grammar school. Éamon de Valera, aged 72, visited on Friday 18 February 1955.

In October 1955, a new 15-acre site was found next to the Mersey, in Didsbury. The new site would cost £300,000, with much of that to be funded by the local Catholic church. There were 430 girls, with 58 in the sixth form

The University of Manchester acquired the site in the late 1950s for student accommodation (Fallowfield Campus), so a new site opened at West Didsbury in September 1961; a new preparatory school was built too. 520 girls joined the new £250,000 school in Didsbury, with grounds of 16 acres. By 1973 there were around 720 girls.

The school had an excellent academic reputation.

Comprehensive
In 1976, the school was requested to become a comprehensive, as direct grant schools were being phased out. It became a comprehensive in 1977.

On Sunday 14 May 1978, the Radio 4 morning service was broadcast from the school.

In 1983, RC Salford Diocese planned to amalgamate the school with the St Mark's school, on the St Mark's site, with the Hollies site closing in August 1984. The Hollies High School closed and the new and The Barlow Roman Catholic High School in 1985.

Demolition
The site was demolished in the late 80s, and it is now a housing estate.

Structure
The school was around a half-mile north-east of the M63 (now M60) junction 5, close to the River Mersey, near the B5167.

Alumni
 Caroline Aherne, actress, known for The Fast Show
 Anne Hobbs, tennis player, didn't take her A levels, left in early 1975 to do tennis
 Dame Joan McVittie, (nee Docherty), headteacher, President from 2011-12 of the Association of School and College Leaders (ASCL)
 Catherine Reilly, bibliographer and anthologist
 Paula Wilcox, actress

See also
 Catholic Church in England
 Harrytown Catholic High School (former Harrytown Convent Girls' School)
 Upton Hall School FCJ

References

External links
 School history

1985 disestablishments in England
Defunct Catholic schools in the Diocese of Salford
Defunct grammar schools in England
Defunct schools in Manchester
Didsbury
Educational institutions disestablished in 1985
Catholic secondary schools in the Diocese of Salford
1900 establishments in England
Educational institutions established in 1900